Elections to local City Dumas (municipal assemblies) were held across Russia in 1917. Following the February Revolution, the Russian Provisional Government began preparations for City Duma election, to precede the 1917 Russian Constituent Assembly election. On 16 April 1917 the new regulations for municipal elections were issued by the Provisional Government. The new regulations abolished the property and taxation requirements for voting. For the first time, suffrage was equal between men and women. Voting age was set at 20 years. Military servicemen were eligible to vote in local elections at sites of deployment.

See also
1917 Baku City Duma election
1917 Ekaterinburg City Duma election
1917 Kiev City Duma election
1917 Minsk City Duma election
1917 Odessa City Duma election

References

Russian Revolution
Local elections in Russia